The Book of Genesis (from Greek ; Hebrew: בְּרֵאשִׁית Bəreʾšīt, "In [the] beginning") is the first book of the Hebrew Bible and the Christian Old Testament. Its Hebrew name is the same as its first word,  ("In the beginning"). Genesis is an account of the creation of the world, the early history of humanity, and of Israel's ancestors and the origins of the Jewish people.

Tradition credits Moses as the author of Genesis, as well as the books of Exodus, Leviticus, Numbers and most of Deuteronomy; however, modern scholars, especially from the 19th century onward, place the books' authorship in the 6th and 5th centuries BC, hundreds of years after Moses is supposed to have lived. Based on scientific interpretation of archaeological, genetic, and linguistic evidence, most mainstream Bible scholars consider Genesis to be primarily mythological rather than historical.

It is divisible into two parts, the primeval history (chapters 1–11) and the ancestral history (chapters 12–50). The primeval history sets out the author's concepts of the nature of the deity and of humankind's relationship with its maker: God creates a world which is good and fit for mankind, but when man corrupts it with sin God decides to destroy his creation, sparing only the righteous Noah and his family to re-establish the relationship between man and God. The ancestral history (chapters 12–50) tells of the prehistory of Israel, God's chosen people. At God's command, Noah's descendant Abraham journeys from his birthplace (described as Ur of the Chaldeans and whose identification with Sumerian Ur is tentative in modern scholarship) into the God-given land of Canaan, where he dwells as a sojourner, as does his son Isaac and his grandson Jacob. Jacob's name is changed to "Israel", and through the agency of his son Joseph, the children of Israel descend into Egypt, 70 people in all with their households, and God promises them a future of greatness. Genesis ends with Israel in Egypt, ready for the coming of Moses and the Exodus (departure). The narrative is punctuated by a series of covenants with God, successively narrowing in scope from all mankind (the covenant with Noah) to a special relationship with one people alone (Abraham and his descendants through Isaac and Jacob).

In Judaism, the theological importance of Genesis centres on the covenants linking God to his chosen people and the people to the Promised Land.

Title 

Composition 

For much of the 20th century, most scholars agreed that the five books of the Pentateuch—Genesis, Exodus, Leviticus, Numbers and Deuteronomy—came from four sources: the Yahwist, the Elohist, the Deuteronomist and the Priestly source. Known as the documentary hypothesis, each source was held to tell the same basic story, with the sources later joined together by various editors. Since the 1970s, however, there has been a revolution in this line of thought, leading scholars to view the Elohist source as no more than a variation on the Yahwist, and the Priestly source as a body of revisions and expansions to the Yahwist (or "non-Priestly") material. (The Deuteronomistic source does not appear in Genesis.)

Scholars use examples of repeated and duplicate stories to identify separate sources. In Genesis, these include three different accounts of a patriarch claiming that his wife was his sister, the two creation stories, and the two versions of Abraham sending Hagar and Ishmael into the desert.

This leaves the question of when these works were created. Scholars in the first half of the 20th century concluded that the Yahwist source was a product of the monarchic period, specifically at the court of Solomon, 10th century BC, and the Priestly work a product of the middle of the 5th century BC (with claims that the author was Ezra). However, more recent thinking is that the Yahwist source dates to from either just before or during the Babylonian captivity in the 6th century BC, and that the Priestly final edition was made late in the Exilic period or soon after. The almost complete absence of all the characters and incidents mentioned in Primeval history from the rest of the Hebrew Bible has led a sizeable minority of scholars to conclude that these chapters were composed much later than those that follow, possibly in the 3rd century BC.

As for why the book was created, a theory which has gained considerable interest, although still controversial, is that of Persian imperial authorisation. This proposes that the Persians of the Achaemenid Empire, after their conquest of Babylon in 539 BC, agreed to grant Jerusalem a large measure of local autonomy within the empire, but required the local authorities to produce a single law code accepted by the entire community. The two powerful groups making up the community—the priestly families who controlled the Second Temple and who traced their origin to Moses and the wilderness wanderings, and the major landowning families who made up the "elders" and who traced their own origins to Abraham, who had "given" them the land—were in conflict over many issues, and each had its own "history of origins". However, the Persian promise of greatly increased local autonomy for all provided a powerful incentive to cooperate in producing a single text.

Genre 
Genesis is an example of a work in the "antiquities" genre, as the Romans knew it, a popular genre telling of the appearance of humans and the ancestors and heroes, with elaborate genealogies and chronologies fleshed out with stories and anecdotes. The most notable examples are found in the work of Greek historians of the 6th century BC: their intention was to connect notable families of their own day to a distant and heroic past, and in doing so they did not distinguish between myth, legend, and facts. Professor Jean-Louis Ska of the Pontifical Biblical Institute calls the basic rule of the antiquarian historian the "law of conservation": everything old is valuable, nothing is eliminated. This antiquity was needed to prove the worth of Israel's traditions to the nations (the neighbours of the Jews in the early Persian province of Judea), and to reconcile and unite the various factions within Israel itself.

Describing the work of the biblical authors, John Van Seters wrote that lacking many historical traditions and none from the distant past, "They had to use myths and legends for earlier periods. In order to make sense out of the variety of different and often conflicting versions of stories, and to relate the stories to each other, they fitted them into a genealogical chronology."

Textual witnesses

There are four major textual witnesses to the book: the Masoretic Text, the Samaritan Pentateuch, the Septuagint, and fragments of Genesis found at Qumran. The Qumran group provides the oldest manuscripts but covers only a small proportion of the book; in general, the Masoretic Text is well preserved and reliable, but there are many individual instances where the other versions preserve a superior reading.

Structure 
Genesis appears to be structured around the recurring phrase , meaning "these are the generations," with the first use of the phrase referring to the "generations of heaven and earth" and the remainder marking individuals—Noah, the "sons of Noah", Shem, etc., down to Jacob. The  formula, occurring eleven times in the book of Genesis, delineating its sections and shaping its structure, serves as a heading which marks a transition to a new subject:
 Genesis 1:1 (narrative) In the beginning
 Genesis 2:4 (narrative)  of Heaven and Earth
 Genesis 5:1 (genealogy)  of Adam
 Genesis 6:9 (narrative)  of Noah
 Genesis 10:1 (genealogy)  of Shem, Ham, and Japheth
 Genesis 11:10 (genealogy)  of Shem
 Genesis 11:27 (narrative)  of Terach
 Genesis 25:12 (genealogy)  of Ishmael
 Genesis 25:19 (narrative)  of Isaac
 Genesis 36:1 and 36:9 (genealogy)  of Esau
 Genesis 37:2 (narrative)  of Jacob

It is not clear, however, what this meant to the original authors, and most modern commentators divide it into two parts based on the subject matter, a "primeval history" (chapters 1–11) and a "patriarchal history" (chapters 12–50). While the first is far shorter than the second, it sets out the basic themes and provides an interpretive key for understanding the entire book. The "primeval history" has a symmetrical structure hinging on chapters 6–9, the flood story, with the events before the flood mirrored by the events after; the "ancestral history" is structured around the three patriarchs Abraham, Jacob and Joseph. (The stories of Isaac do not make up a coherent cycle of stories and function as a bridge between the cycles of Abraham and Jacob.)

Summary

Primeval history (chapters 1–11)

The Genesis creation narrative comprises two different stories; the first two chapters roughly correspond to these. In the first, Elohim, the generic Hebrew word for God, creates the heavens and the earth including humankind, in six days, and rests on the seventh. In the second, God, now referred to as "Yahweh Elohim" (the LORD God), creates two individuals, Adam and Eve, as the first man and woman, and places them in the Garden of Eden.

In the third chapter, God instructs them not to eat the fruit of the tree of the knowledge of good and evil. They promise not to, but a talking serpent, portrayed as a deceptive creature or trickster, convinces Eve to eat the fruit against God's wishes, and she convinces Adam, whereupon God throws them out and curses both of them—Adam was cursed with getting what he needs only by sweat and work, and Eve to giving birth in pain. This is interpreted by Christians as the "fall of man" into sin. Eve bears two sons, Cain and Abel. Cain works in the garden, and Abel works with meat; they both offer offerings to God one day, and God does not accept Cain's offering but does accept Abel's. This causes Cain to resent Abel, and Cain ends up murdering him. God then curses Cain. Eve bears another son, Seth, to take Abel's place.

After many generations of Adam have passed from the lines of Cain and Seth, the world becomes corrupted by human sin and Nephilim, and God wants to wipe out humanity for their wickedness. However, Noah is the only good human; so first, he instructs the righteous Noah and his family to build an ark and put examples of all the animals on it, seven pairs of every clean animal and one pair of every unclean. Then God sends a great flood to wipe out the rest of the world. When the waters recede, God promises he will never destroy the world with water again, making a rainbow as a symbol of his promise. God sees mankind cooperating to build a great tower city, the Tower of Babel, and divides humanity with many languages and sets them apart with confusion. Then, a generation line from Shem to Abram is described.

Patriarchal age (chapters 12–50)

Abram, a man descended from Noah, is instructed by God to travel from his home in Mesopotamia to the land of Canaan. There, God makes a promise to Abram, promising that his descendants shall be as numerous as the stars, but that people will suffer oppression in a foreign land for four hundred years, after which they will inherit the land "from the river of Egypt to the great river, the river Euphrates". Abram's name is changed to 'Abraham' and that of his wife Sarai to Sarah (meaning "princess"), and God says that all males should be circumcised as a sign of his promise to Abraham. Due to her old age, Sarah tells Abraham to take her Egyptian handmaiden, Hagar, as a second wife (to bear a child). Through Hagar, Abraham fathers Ishmael.

God then plans to destroy the cities of Sodom and Gomorrah for the sins of their people. Abraham protests but fails to get God to agree not to destroy the cities (his reasoning being that everybody there is evil, except for Abraham's nephew Lot). Angels save Abraham's nephew Lot (who was living there at the same time) and his family, but his wife looks back on the destruction, (even though God commanded not to) and turns into a pillar of salt for going against his word. Lot's daughters, concerned that they are fugitives who will never find husbands, get Lot drunk so they can become pregnant by him, and give birth to the ancestors of the Moabites and Ammonites.

Abraham and Sarah go to the Philistine town of Gerar, pretending to be brother and sister (they are half-siblings). The King of Gerar takes Sarah for his wife, but God warns him to return her (as she is really Abraham's wife) and he obeys. God sends Sarah a son and tells her she should name him Isaac; through him will be the establishment of the covenant (promise). Sarah then drives Ishmael and his mother Hagar out into the wilderness (because Ishmael is not her real son and Hagar is a slave), but God saves them and promises to make Ishmael a great nation.

Then, God tests Abraham by demanding that he sacrifice Isaac. As Abraham is about to lay the knife upon his son, God restrains him, promising him again innumerable descendants. On the death of Sarah, Abraham purchases Machpelah (believed to be modern Hebron) for a family tomb and sends his servant to Mesopotamia to find among his relations a wife for Isaac; after proving herself worthy, Rebekah becomes Isaac's betrothed. Keturah, Abraham's other wife, births more children, among whose descendants are the Midianites. Abraham dies at a prosperous old age and his family lays him to rest in Hebron (Machpelah).

Isaac's wife Rebekah gives birth to the twins Esau (meaning "velvet"), father of the Edomites, and Jacob (meaning "supplanter" or "follower"). Esau was a couple of seconds older as he had come out of the womb first, and was going to become the heir; however, through carelessness, he sold his birthright to Jacob for a bowl of stew. His mother, Rebekah, ensures Jacob rightly gains his father's blessing as the firstborn son and inheritor. At 77 years of age, Jacob leaves his parents and later seeks a wife and meets Rachel at a well. He goes to her father, his uncle, where he works for a total of 14 years to earn his wives, Rachel and Leah. Jacob's name is changed to 'Israel', and by his wives and their handmaidens he has twelve sons, the ancestors of the twelve tribes of the children of Israel, and a daughter, Dinah.

Joseph, Jacob's favourite son of the twelve, makes his brothers jealous (especially because of special gifts Jacob gave him) and because of that jealousy they sell Joseph into slavery in Egypt. Joseph endures many trials including being innocently sentenced to jail but he stays faithful to God. After several years, he prospers there after the pharaoh of Egypt asks him to interpret a dream he had about an upcoming famine, which Joseph does through God. He is then made second in command of Egypt by the grateful pharaoh, and later on, he is reunited with his father and brothers, who fail to recognize him and plead for food as the famine had reached Canaan as well. After much manipulation to see if they still hate him, Joseph reveals himself, forgives them for their actions, and lets them and their households into Egypt, where Pharaoh assigns to them the land of Goshen. Jacob calls his sons to his bedside and reveals their future before he dies. Joseph lives to old age and tells his brothers before his death that if God leads them out of the country, then they should take his bones with them.

Themes

Promises to the ancestors 
In 1978, David Clines published The Theme of the Pentateuch. Considered influential as one of the first authors to take up the question of the overarching theme of the Pentateuch, Clines' conclusion was that the overall theme is "the partial fulfilment—which implies also the partial nonfulfillment—of the promise to or blessing of the Patriarchs". (By calling the fulfilment "partial", Clines was drawing attention to the fact that at the end of Deuteronomy the people of Israel are still outside Canaan.)

The patriarchs, or ancestors, are Abraham, Isaac and Jacob, with their wives (Joseph is normally excluded). Since the name YHWH had not been revealed to them, they worshipped El in his various manifestations. (It is, however, worth noting that in the Jahwist source, the patriarchs refer to deity by the name YHWH, for example in Genesis 15.) Through the patriarchs, God announces the election of Israel, that is, he chooses Israel to be his special people and commits himself to their future. God tells the patriarchs that he will be faithful to their descendants (i.e. to Israel), and Israel is expected to have faith in God and his promise. ("Faith" in the context of Genesis and the Hebrew Bible means an agreement to the promissory relationship, not a body of a belief.)

The promise itself has three parts: offspring, blessings, and land. The fulfilment of the promise to each patriarch depends on having a male heir, and the story is constantly complicated by the fact that each prospective mother—Sarah, Rebekah and Rachel—is barren. The ancestors, however, retain their faith in God and God in each case gives a son—in Jacob's case, twelve sons, the foundation of the chosen Israelites. Each succeeding generation of the three promises attains a more rich fulfilment, until through Joseph "all the world" attains salvation from famine, and by bringing the children of Israel down to Egypt he becomes the means through which the promise can be fulfilled.

God's chosen people 

Scholars generally agree that the theme of divine promise unites the patriarchal cycles, but many would dispute the efficacy of trying to examine Genesis' theology by pursuing a single overarching theme, instead citing as more productive the analysis of the Abraham cycle, the Jacob cycle, and the Joseph cycle, and the Yahwist and Priestly sources. The problem lies in finding a way to unite the patriarchal theme of the divine promise to the stories of Genesis 1–11 (the primeval history) with their theme of God's forgiveness in the face of man's evil nature. One solution is to see the patriarchal stories as resulting from God's decision not to remain alienated from mankind: God creates the world and mankind, mankind rebels, and God "elects" (chooses) Abraham.

To this basic plot (which comes from the Yahwist), the Priestly source has added a series of covenants dividing history into stages, each with its own distinctive "sign". The first covenant is between God and all living creatures, and is marked by the sign of the rainbow; the second is with the descendants of Abraham (Ishmaelites and others as well as Israelites), and its sign is circumcision; and the last, which does not appear until the Book of Exodus, is with Israel alone, and its sign is Sabbath. A great leader mediates each covenant (Noah, Abraham, Moses), and at each stage God progressively reveals himself by his name (Elohim with Noah, El Shaddai with Abraham, Yahweh with Moses).

Judaism's weekly Torah portions in the Book of Genesis 

The  is a section of the Torah (Five Books of Moses) used in Jewish liturgy during a particular week.

The first 12 of the 54 come from the Book of Genesis, and they are:
 Chapters 1–6 (verses 1–8) Parashat Bereshit
 Chapters 6 (v. 9 ff)–11 Parashat Noach
 Chapters 12–17 Parashat Lekh Lekha
 Chapters 18–22 Parashat Vayera
 Chapters 23–25 (v. 1–18) Parashat Chayyei Sarah
 Chapters 25 (v. 19 ff)–28 (v. 1–9) Parashat Toledot
 Chapters 28 (v. 10 ff)–32 (v. 1–3) Parashat Vayetzei
 Chapters 32 (v. 4 ff)–36 Parashat Vayishlach
 Chapters 37–40 Parashat Vayeshev
 Chapters 41–44 (v. 1–17) Parashat Miketz
 Chapters 44 (v. 18 ff)–47 (v. 1–27) Parashat Vayigash
 Chapters 47 (v. 28 ff)–50 Parashat Vayechi

See also 

 Biblical criticism
 Criticism of the Bible
 Dating the Bible
 
 Genesis 1:1
 Genesis creation narrative
 Historicity of the Bible
 Mosaic authorship
 Paradise Lost
 Protevangelium
 Wife–sister narratives in the Book of Genesis

Notes

References

Bibliography

Commentaries on Genesis 

 
 
 
 
 
 
 
 
 Fretheim, Terence E. "The Book of Genesis." In The New Interpreter's Bible. Edited by Leander E. Keck, vol. 1, pp. 319–674. Nashville: Abingdon Press, 1994. .
 
 
 Hirsch, Samson Raphael. The Pentateuch: Genesis. Translated by Isaac Levy. Judaica Press, 2nd edition 1999. . Originally published as Der Pentateuch uebersetzt und erklaert Frankfurt, 1867–1878.
 Kass, Leon R. The Beginning of Wisdom: Reading Genesis. New York: Free Press, 2003. .
 
 
 Plaut, Gunther. The Torah: A Modern Commentary (1981), 
 
 
 Sarna, Nahum M. The JPS Torah Commentary: Genesis: The Traditional Hebrew Text with the New JPS Translation. Philadelphia: Jewish Publication Society, 1989. .
 Speiser, E.A. Genesis: Introduction, Translation, and Notes. New York: Anchor Bible, 1964. .

General

External links 
  Various versions	

 
Genesis
Genesis
Mythology books
1
Creation myths